Achille Alberti (1860, in Milan – July 15, 1943) was an Italian sculptor.

Biography
Born in Milan, where he completed his studies at the Brera Academy under Pietro Magni and Riccardo Ripamonti. He later taught sculpture at the Academy. Like the sculptor Achille D'Orsi, he often depicted genre subjects, but he also completed scenes from classical history. In 1885, he completed the works Il Catone Uticense and Vittime del lavoro.

His statuette, Il barcaiuolo,  was exhibited in 1883, and the next year in Turin. He also completed the bronze statuary group Due giugno; Apoteosi (1886);  Leda (1887, Mostra di Venice); a stucco Mater dolorosa (1888, Bologna); a bronze figurine of Il panattiere; and Maria, a marble bas-relief. At the Galleria d'Arte Moderna of Milan, a half dozen of his works are displayed: a bronze bas-relief of Pindar in the Theater of Athens (1891); a stucco bas-relief of Bathers (1891); a marble Portrait of the poet Gian Pietro Lucini (1897);  a marble bust of Maniscalco (1900); a bronze Virago (1907); and a bronze Bustino di Ragazzo (1910).

References

1860 births
1943 deaths
Artists from Milan
Brera Academy alumni
Academic staff of Brera Academy
19th-century Italian sculptors
Italian male sculptors
20th-century Italian sculptors
20th-century Italian male artists
19th-century Italian male artists